The Conant Baronetcy, of Lyndon in the County of Rutland, is a title in the Baronetage of the United Kingdom. It was created on 30 June 1954 for the Conservative Party politician Roger Conant. The second Baronet was High Sheriff of Rutland in 1960.

Conant baronets, of Lyndon (1954)
Sir Roger John Edward Conant, 1st Baronet (1899–1973)
Sir John Ernest Michael Conant, 2nd Baronet (born 1923)

Arms

Family Tree

Notes

References
Kidd, Charles, Williamson, David (editors). Debrett's Peerage and Baronetage (1990 edition). New York: St Martin's Press, 1990, 

 

Conant